Henrik Walentin (born 22 August 1967) is a Danish former competitive figure skater. He is the 1991 Karl Schäfer Memorial bronze medalist, a five-time Nordic champion, and a three-time Danish national champion. Walentin placed tenth at the 1992 European Championships in Lausanne and was selected to represent Denmark at the 1992 Winter Olympics in Albertville, where he finished 22nd.

Competitive highlights

References 

1967 births
Danish male single skaters
Olympic figure skaters of Denmark
Living people
People from Glostrup Municipality
Figure skaters at the 1992 Winter Olympics
Sportspeople from the Capital Region of Denmark